Sola Asedeko is a Nigerian film actress, film-maker and director. She is popularly known as Abeni for her lead role in Abeni, a 2006 Nigerian film, produced and directed by Tunde Kelani.

Early life
Asedeko was born in Lagos State, southwestern Nigeria.
She attended Sonmori Comprehensive High School (SONCOHS) at Ifako Ijaiye where she obtained the West Africa School Certificate before she proceeded to the University of Lagos where she received a bachelor's degree in theatre art and later obtained a master's degree in public administration.

Career
She began acting in 2006, the same year she played a lead role in Abeni (film), a film produced and directed by Tunde Kelani. The film made her a household name and became a choice of Tunde Kelani in his award-winning film titled The Narrow Path, where she also played the lead role of a village young girl who must choose between two suitors.
She had featured in several Nigerian films and soap operas.

Filmography
Abeni (2006)
The Narrow Path (2006)

References

Actresses from Lagos State
Nigerian film actresses
Living people
Year of birth missing (living people)
Yoruba actresses
Actresses in Yoruba cinema
University of Lagos alumni
21st-century Nigerian actresses